The 2020–21 CAA men's basketball season narked the 35th season of Colonial Athletic Association basketball, taking place between November 2020 and March 2021.  The season began with practices in November 2020, followed by the start of the 2020–21 NCAA Division I men's basketball season in late November, delayed due to the COVID-19 pandemic.  The season ended with the 2021 CAA men's basketball tournament.

Head coaches

Coaching changes 
Takayo Siddle replaced C. B. McGrath as UNC Wilmington head coach.
Mark Byington replaced Louis Rowe as James Madison head coach.

Coaches 

Notes:
 All records, appearances, titles, etc. are from time with current school only.
 Year at school includes 2020–21 season.
 Overall and CAA records are from time at current school and are through the end of the 2019–20 season.

Preseason

Preseason poll 

Source

() first place votes

Preseason All-Conference Teams 
Source

Colonial Athletic Association Preseason Player of the Year: Matt Lewis (James Madison)

Regular season

Rankings

Conference matrix 
This table summarizes the head-to-head results between teams in conference play.

Postseason

Colonial Athletic Association tournament

NCAA tournament 

The CAA had one bid to the 2021 NCAA Division I men's basketball tournament, that being the automatic bid of Drexel by winning the conference tournament.

National Invitation tournament

College Basketball Invitational

CollegeInsider.com Postseason tournament

Awards and honors

Regular season

CAA Player-of-the-Week

 Nov. 30 – Jaylen Sims (UNCW)
 Dec. 7  – Camren Wynter (Drexel)
 Dec. 14 – Tyson Walker (Northeastern)
 Dec. 21 – Jalen Ray (Hofstra)
 Dec. 28 – Jalen Ray (Hofstra) (2)
 Jan. 4  – Isaac Kante (Hofstra)
 Jan. 11 – Tyson Walker (Northeastern) (2)
 Jan. 18 – Matt Lewis (James Madison), Dylan Painter (Delaware)
 Jan. 25 – Tareq Coburn (Hofstra)
 Feb. 1  – Connor Kochera (William & Mary)
 Feb. 8  – Zep Jasper (Charleston)
 Feb. 15 – Tyson Walker (Northeastern) (3)
 Feb. 22 – Darius Burford (Elon)
 Mar. 1  – Camren Wynter (Drexel) (2)

CAA Rookie-of-the-Week

 Nov. 30 – Connor Kochera (William & Mary)
 Dec. 7  – Kvonn Cramer (Hofstra)
 Dec. 14 – Jahmyl Telfort (Northeastern)
 Dec. 21 – Yuri Covington (William & Mary)
 Dec. 28 – Kvonn Cramer (Hofstra) (2)
 Jan. 4  – Jahmyl Telfort (Northeastern) (2)
 Jan. 11 – Justin Amadi (James Madison)
 Jan. 18 – Andrew Carr (Delaware)
 Jan. 25 – Jahmyl Telfort (Northeastern) (3)
 Feb. 1  – Kvonn Cramer (Hofstra) (3)
 Feb. 8  – Terell Strickland (James Madison)
 Feb. 15 – Terrence Edwards (James Madison)
 Feb. 22 – Darius Burford (Elon)
 Mar. 1  – Darius Burford (Elon) (2)

Postseason

CAA All-Conference Teams and Awards

Attendance

References